Storkerson Bay is a Canadian Arctic waterway in the Northwest Territories.  It is an arm of Amundsen Gulf on central western Banks Island.

Historically, it has been a wintering area for Inuvialuit families.

References

Bays of the Northwest Territories
Geography of the Inuvialuit Settlement Region